Asperula asterocephala is a deciduous species of perennial groundcover, and a flowering plant in the family Rubiaceae, known as Woodruff, and is endemic to Iraq, and was first named by Bornm.

Description
Asperula asterocephala appears as a long, green plant, with small (1in) white flowers, on long, thin, green stems, it has compact, green leaves.

Growth cycle
Asperula asterocephala flowers around May-June, and grows best in a rock garden, trough or crevice.

References

asterocephala
Taxa named by Joseph Friedrich Nicolaus Bornmüller